The Moomins (Polish: Opowiadania Muminków, German: Die Mumins) is a stop motion animated children's television series based on the Tove Jansson's Moomin series of books which was produced by Se-ma-for and Jupiter Film between 1977 and 1982 for Polish, Austrian and German television. The series was later sold to other countries including the UK. The British version was adapted by Anne Wood at FilmFair for ITV Central and broadcast in the UK. Series 1 was first shown on Monday 24 January 1983 at 4:15 pm  and series 2 on Monday 7 January 1985 at 4.15pm on Children's ITV, and series 2 was repeated in 1986. The series was last repeated in its entirety in 1988. It was narrated by British actor Richard Murdoch.

This series was the third series to be made based on the Moomin books. Two more were subsequently made. It is one of the two best-known Moomin series (along with the Japanese-made anime version Moomin (1990). The 1977–1982 stop-motion version has been criticised for being scary in places and rather dark in tone for the young audience at which it was aimed. It is, in contrast to the 1990s series, widely believed to be the most faithful TV adaptation of Tove Jansson's stories, and much closer to her vision. Tove herself had a great deal of involvement during the series' production and was very happy with it (as revealed in an interview with Anne Wood in Simon Sheridan's 2007 book The A to Z of Classic Children's Television). The scripts for each episode were translated from Polish into Swedish and sent to Tove and Lars Jansson, who, if they felt that anything needed to be changed, corrected the script, expanding or rewriting it; afterwards, the scripts were sent back and only then did production of the particular episode begin.

In 2010, an HD version of the series was released. It was later followed by a new US-produced English dub in 2017.

Music
The series had an orchestral score, composed by Andrzej Rokicki, with a whimsical opening theme, resembling the melody of a songbird. The German and Austrian dub retained most of the score, and added themes written by Eugen Illin, who also composed a different opening theme. For the shortened and re-edited UK release, a new score was composed by Graeme Miller and Steve Shill. Its opening titles featured a bouncy theme tune consisting of flutes and synthesizers, played against a popular still of Moomintroll holding a hat.

Episode list
The original Polish series consisted of 78 ten-minute episodes, narrated initially by Stanisław Wyszyński, and subsequently by Stanisław Kwaśniak. The German and Austrian dub retained the full length of the original series, with the narration provided by Hans Clarin. The UK adaptation was shortened and re-edited into 100 five-minute episodes, narrated by Richard Murdoch.

Series 1 of the UK release consisted of 50 episodes, and was first broadcast Mondays to Fridays at 4:15 pm, 24 January to 6 April 1983 on Children's ITV. Series 2 consisting of another 50 episodes first aired Monday to Fridays at 4:15 pm, 7 January to 15 March 1985 on Children's ITV.

Series one

Series two

The order above is the correct broadcast order, for when the episodes were first shown on UK television in 1983 (taken from the original script list). The episode order in the recent DVD boxset was changed, so that the English episodes were intended to match the German broadcast order (but they were in fact different). In the UK, the series ended with the Comet in Moominland story. Series 1 was shown in 1983 and series 2 in 1985. Series 2 was repeated in 1986. The series was also repeated in its entirety in 1988. (Confirmed by the sleeve notes from Finders Keepers Moomin soundtrack release 2016).

Impact and critical reaction

In 2008 the series was listed at number 25 in a list of top 50 children's TV by The Times. Excerpts from the series have been shown at film festivals in the UK and Japan.

Home release
A Region 2 DVD boxset was released in 2004, in both English and German editions (both versions manufactured in Austria).

Single DVD releases are also available, which contain English and German episodes. The German episodes have English subtitles and the English episodes have German subtitles.

The complete series in its original Polish version, which was longer than the UK re-edit and had a different musical score, was released in Poland in 2009, as a 5-DVD Region 2 box set.

Films
 Moomin and Midsummer Madness was released in 2008, based on a compilation of Episodes 51-65.
 Moomins and the Comet Chase was released in 2010, based on a compilation of Episodes 88-100.
 Moomins and the Winter Wonderland was released in 2017, based on a compilation of Episodes 23-33.

References
Simon Sheridan The A to Z of Classic Children's Television (Reynolds & Hearn books, 2004, reprinted 2007) . Contains a long chapter on the making of the TV series, a rare photo of Tove Jansson and an interview with UK series producer Anne Wood.

Notes

External links
 Fuzzy Felts: The DVD History of The Moomins (1978–1982) TV Series
 
 The Moomins TV Series Distribution

1980s British children's television series
1977 Polish television series debuts
1982 Polish television series endings
1983 British television series debuts
1985 British television series endings
ITV children's television shows
Moomin television series
Television shows based on children's books
Stop-motion animated television series
Television series by FilmFair
Television series by Cookie Jar Entertainment
Television series by DHX Media
Television series by ITV Studios
British children's animated adventure television series
Polish children's animated adventure television series
1970s Polish television series
1980s Polish television series
1970s animated television series
1980s animated television series
Telewizja Polska original programming